William J. Scanlan (February 14, 1856 – February 18, 1898) was a composer and actor of musical theater.

Biography
William J. Scanlan was born to parents of Irish ancestry in Springfield, Massachusetts. After completing the 100th performance of his musical show Mavourneen on December 24, 1891, he became violently ill. He was taken to Bloomingdale Insane Asylum in White Plains, New York on January 7, 1892. He died there on February 18, 1898.

References

External links

1856 births
1898 deaths
American male musical theatre actors
American musical theatre composers
Burials at Calvary Cemetery (Queens)
Actors from Springfield, Massachusetts
19th-century American composers
19th-century American male actors
19th-century American male singers
19th-century American singers
Musicians from Springfield, Massachusetts